Li Yongbo (born September 18, 1962) is a retired Chinese male badminton player and the former head coach of Chinese National Badminton Team.

Career
As a player, he was a men's doubles specialist noted for his quickness, reflexes, and power. From the mid-1980s to the early 1990s he shared numerous international titles with his regular partner Tian Bingyi. They were contemporaries and rivals of the famous Korean pair Park Joo-bong and Kim Moon-soo, largely dividing badminton's biggest doubles events between them for about eight seasons. Among many other tournaments around the world Li and Tian captured the (then biennial) World Championships in 1987 and 1989, the prestigious All-England Championships in 1987, 1988, and 1991, and the Danish Open in 1985, 1987, 1989, 1990, and 1991. They also played on Chinese Thomas Cup (men's international) teams that won consecutive world team titles in 1986, 1988, and 1990. Late in their partnership they won a bronze medal in men's doubles at the 1992 Olympic Games in Barcelona.

As the Chinese badminton women's doubles coach during the 2012 Summer Olympics in London, his players were banned from competition for "tanking" their match against South Korea, who won the match but were also banned similarly (as were the Indonesian women's doubles team). Li has admitted his role in the scandal; insiders say Li used fear tactics and intimidation to a strategic advantage in national and Olympic competition. By losing, his team would have avoided playing another Chinese team.

Following the conclusion of the Rio Olympics, where China won two gold medals, he stood down in 2017.

Achievements

Olympic Games 
Men's doubles

World Championships 
Men's doubles

World Cup 
Men's doubles

Asian Games 
Men's doubles

IBF World Grand Prix (27 titles, 8 runners-up) 
The World Badminton Grand Prix sanctioned by International Badminton Federation (IBF) since from 1983 to 2006.

Men's doubles

References

External links
 
 
 

1962 births
Living people
Badminton players at the 1992 Summer Olympics
Badminton players from Dalian
Olympic badminton players of China
Olympic bronze medalists for China
Olympic medalists in badminton
Asian Games medalists in badminton
Chinese badminton coaches
Badminton players at the 1986 Asian Games
Chinese male badminton players
Badminton players at the 1990 Asian Games
Badminton players at the 1988 Summer Olympics
Medalists at the 1992 Summer Olympics
Asian Games gold medalists for China
Asian Games silver medalists for China
Medalists at the 1986 Asian Games
Medalists at the 1990 Asian Games
World No. 1 badminton players
20th-century Chinese people